This is a list of transfers in Serbian football for the 2015 summer transfer window.
Only moves featuring a Serbian SuperLiga side are listed.
The order by which the clubs are listed is equal to the classification at the end of 2014–15 Serbian SuperLiga.

Serbian SuperLiga

Partizan

In: 

Out:

Red Star Belgrade

In:

Out:

Čukarički

In: 

Out:

Vojvodina

In: 

Out:

Novi Pazar

In: 

Out:

Rad

In: 

Out:

Mladost Lučani

In: 

Out:

OFK Beograd

In: 

Out:

Radnički Niš

In: 

Out:

Jagodina

In: 

Out:

Spartak Subotica

In: 

Out:

Voždovac

In: 

Out:

Borac Čačak

In: 

Out:

Radnik Surdulica

In: 

Out:

Javor Ivanjica

In: 

Out:

Metalac Gornji Milanovac

In: 

Out:

See also
Serbian SuperLiga
2015–16 Serbian SuperLiga

References

Serbian SuperLiga
2015
transfers